Cervi is an Italian surname. Notable people with the surname include:

Al Cervi (1917–2009), American basketball player
Bernardino Cervi, Italian scholar
Dominic Cervi, American soccer player
Federico Cervi, Italian fencer
Franco Cervi, Argentine footballer
Gino Cervi (1901–1974), Italian actor
Valentina Cervi, Italian film actress
Cervi Brothers, Italian anti-fascists

See also

Cerva (surname)

References

surnames

 

Italian-language surnames